Abraham or Abe Martin may refer to:

Abraham Martin, British Crown's judicial representative as High Sheriff of Sligo in 1805 Ireland
Abe Martin (comic strip), ran in U.S. newspapers from 1904 until 1937
Abe Martin (Illinois coach) (1906–1997), born Morris Glenn Martin, American football, basketball and baseball coach
Abe Martin (Texas coach) (1908–1979), born Othol Hershel Martin, American college football player, head coach and administrator

See also
Abby Martin (disambiguation)
Abbé Martin (disambiguation)
Abbey of Saint Martin (disambiguation)
Abbot Martin (527–601), French hermit and evangelist
Abbess Martin (1604–1672), Irish nun from Galway
Martin Abraham (born 1978), Czech footballer
Martin Abraham (1886–1981), American jazz tubist, stage name Chink Martin

Martin, Abe